Daviesia croniniana is a species of flowering plant in the family Fabaceae and is endemic to the south-west of Western Australia. It is a compact, bushy shrub with hairy foliage, erect, broadly linear phyllodes and yellow or orange and reddish-brown flowers.

Description

Taxonomy and naming
Daviesia croniniana was first formally described in 1894 by Ferdinand von Mueller in The Victorian Naturalist from specimens collected by Michael Cronin "towards Lake Lefroy". The specific epithet (croniniana) honours the collector of the type specimens.

Distribution and habitat
This species of pea grows in sandplains and kwongan heathland between Coolgardie, Cunderdin and Marble Rocks Nature Reserve in the Avon Wheatbelt, Coolgardie and Mallee biogeographic regions of south-western Western Australia.

Conservation status
Daviesia croniniana is classified as "not threatened" by the Government of Western Australia Department of Biodiversity, Conservation and Attractions.

References

croniniana
Eudicots of Western Australia
Plants described in 1894
Taxa named by Ferdinand von Mueller